Barreno is a surname. Notable people with the surname include:

Maria Isabel Barreno (1939–2016), Portuguese writer
Rafael Barreno (born 1977), Venezuelan sport wrestler

See also
Marcos García Barreno (born 1987), Spanish footballer
Barrino